The Peiligang culture was a Neolithic culture in the Yi-Luo river basin (in modern Henan Province, China) that existed from 7000 to 5000 BC. Over 100 sites have been identified with the Peiligang culture, nearly all of them in a fairly compact area of about 100 square kilometers in the area just south of the river and along its banks.

Peiligang culture
The culture is named after the site discovered in 1977 at Peiligang, a village in Xinzheng County. Archaeologists believe that the Peiligang culture was egalitarian, with little political organization.

The culture practiced agriculture in the form of cultivating millet and animal husbandry in the form of raising pigs and possibly poultry. The people hunted deer and wild boar, and fished for carp in the nearby river, using nets made from hemp fibers. The culture is also one of the oldest in ancient China to make pottery. This culture typically had separate residential and burial areas, or cemeteries, like most Neolithic cultures. Common artifacts include stone arrowheads, spearheads and axe heads; stone tools such as chisels, awls and sickles for harvesting grain; and a broad assortment of pottery items for such purposes as cooking and storing grain.

Jiahu

The site at Jiahu is the earliest site associated with Peiligang culture. There are many similarities between the main group of Peiligang settlements and the Jiahu culture, which was isolated several days' travel to the south of the main group. Archaeologists are divided about the relationship between Jiahu and the main group. Most agree that Jiahu was part of the Peiligang culture, pointing to the many similarities. A few archaeologists are pointing to the differences, as well as the distance, believing that Jiahu was a neighbor that shared many cultural characteristics with Peiligang, but was a separate culture. The cultivation of rice, for example, was unique to Jiahu and was not practiced among the villages of the main Peiligang group in the north. Also, Jiahu existed for several hundred years before any of the settlements of the main group.

Gallery

See also
 Jiahu symbols
 Prehistoric Beifudi site

References

Bibliography
 

Neolithic cultures of China
History of Henan
7th-millennium BC establishments